Rossano Cathedral (Cattedrale di Maria Santissima Achiropita) is a Roman Catholic cathedral in  Rossano, a frazione of Corigliano-Rossano, Calabria, southern Italy, dedicated to the Blessed Virgin Mary as Maria Santissima Acheropita. It is the seat of the Archbishop of Rossano-Cariati, and previously of the Bishops and Archbishops of Rossano.

History and description
The cathedral was built in the 11th century, with substantial reconstruction in the 18th and 19th centuries. It has a central nave and two side-aisles, terminating in three apses. The bell tower and the baptismal font date from the 14th century, while the other artworks and furnishings are of the 17th and 18th centuries.

Maria Santissima Acheropita
The cathedral houses an ancient image of the Madonna Acheropita, an image of the Madonna and Child supposedly discovered in the cathedral plaster and not painted by human hand, which is dated to somewhere between about 580 and the first half of the 8th century.

Rossano Gospels

In the sacristy in 1879 was discovered the Codex Purpureus Rossanensis ("Rossano Gospels"), a Greek evangeliary of the 5th or 6th century of Middle Eastern origin (probably Antioch), which was probably brought to Rossano by a monk taking refuge from the Arab invasions of the Middle East during the 9th and 10th centuries.

The manuscript comprises 188 leaves of parchment dyed purple containing the Gospels of Matthew and Mark and the Epistula ad Carpianum (a letter from Eusebius of Caesarea to a Christian named Carpianus). Although it is mutilated and anonymous, the manuscript is perhaps the most representative testimony of the Byzantine connections of Rossano. The texts are in gold and silver ink, with 15 miniatures showing the most important moments in the life and preaching of Jesus.

References

External links
 Website of the Archdiocese of Rossano-Cariati: Cattedrale Maria SS.ma Achiropita 
 Museo Diocesano e del Codex, Rossano: cathedral 

Roman Catholic cathedrals in Italy
Cathedrals in Calabria
Churches in the province of Cosenza
Buildings and structures in Rossano